Burwell  is a village and civil parish in Cambridgeshire, England, some 10 miles (16 km) north-east of Cambridge. It lies on the south-east edge of the Fens. Westward drainage is improved by Cambridgeshire lodes (waterways), including Burwell Lode, a growth factor in the village. A population of 6,309 in the 2011 census was put at 6,417 in 2019.

History

Etymology
The name "Burwell", Anglo-Saxon in origin, refers to a fort (burh-) close to a spring (-well). The first record of the name dates from 1060. It appears in the 1086 Domesday Book as Burewelle, Burwella and Burwelle. There is a spring in the south of the village, close to remains of the 12th-century Burwell Castle, and evidence of previous settlement on or near the castle site.

Old maps sometimes name the village in the plural, "Burwells". which may refer to a pair of parishes: Burwell St Mary and Burwell St Andrew, or to a distinction between the High Town round the churches in the south of the village and the newer North Street and Newnham parts, separated by a causeway.

Early settlement
There is evidence of prehistoric human activity in the vicinity of Burwell. Flint tools such as axes dating from the Palaeolithic and Mesolithic have been found on the west side of the village. Other burned and worked flint has been found close to the spring, dating from the late Neolithic, but most of the activity in the area at the time seemed to have been on the fen to the west of the village, where a large number of flint and stone tools discovered on a raised piece of ground suggest there was already settlement before the onset of the https://uploadpie.com/NASxMyBronze Age. During the Neolithic, peat began to form on the fenland round the village, which partly buried the prehistoric sites.

Activity on the fen continued into the Bronze Age, as did activity close to the spring but they were joined by increasing activity on the heath in the south of the parish, where barrows are known to have existed. The southern part of the parish is also the highest ground within it, and is close to the ancient Icknield Way.

As Burwell entered the Iron Age, activity on the fens to the west appears to have decreased as the conditions became more marshy. However, ditch systems and enclosures were found there during excavations in 1969 and 1995. Activity near the spring continued, with evidence of a burial in a nearby ditch. Settlement was revealed in 2005 on the eastern edge of the village.

Settlement close to the spring continued after Roman colonisation of Britain. Roman archaeological remains have been found round the village, including pottery, vessels and bowls, a lead vat, and coins perhaps relating to a villa in Ness Road, north of the village. Evidence of another villa in the same area comes in roof tiles from the 2nd century CE, although findings here and there cover the 2nd to 4th centuries. Reach Lode on the north-west edge was probably of Roman construction, as was the original Burwell Lode, since been replaced.

Waterway
The village is located at the head of Burwell Lode, a man-made waterway that connects it with the River Cam. The present course, laid out in the mid-17th century, replaced an older route that was probably Roman in origin. The lode splits in two at the village, each branch serving a series of basins, warehouses and wharves located at the bottom of long strips of land, with merchants' houses at the far end of them.

The village and lode gained importance with the opening in the 1850s of the Burwell Chemical Works owned by T. T. Ball. By the 1890s, this had become the Patent Manure Works owned by Colchester and Ball. About 10,000 tons of goods a year were shipped along it, using three steam tugs and a fleet of lighters. Prentice Brothers Ltd built barges in the village until 1920, and continued repairing them there after they bought the fertiliser factory in 1921. The factory was later owned by Fisons. Boats continued to be used to move the fertiliser to Fenland farms until 1948. Commercial use of the lode ceased in 1963, when the traffic in sugar beet stopped.

Burwell Castle
The village is the site of an unfinished castle in Spring Close, whose final wall was knocked down by the Fire Brigade testing a fire hose in the 1930s, but the dry moat is still visible. It was built during "The Anarchy", the mid-12th-century conflict in the reign of King Stephen. Despite a settlement that the throne would pass to Henry II on Stephen's death, the Barons took the opportunity to fight their own battles. Of these, Geoffrey de Mandeville was notably troublesome. After turning against Stephen, he set up an impregnable base around Ely, from which he attacked towns such as Cambridge. So the king ordered castles be built to surround him. The few known potential sites of these included Rampton (Giant's Hill), Ramsey (Booth's Hill), Burwell, and possibly Knapwell.

At Burwell, a moat was constructed and the stone keep partially built when Geoffrey attacked and was mortally wounded. His revolt then collapsed and the castle was left unfinished. The narrow lane along the side of the church next to Spring Close, where the Castle stood, is named Mandeville.

Barn Fire

On 8 September 1727, a travelling puppet show was filled with onlookers in a Burwell barn in what is now Cuckolds Row, near the centre of the village. The doors were nailed shut to stop further people getting in, an act that led to tragedy. Richard Whittaker, an ostler employed by the owner of the barn came back to feed the horses. He seems to expect to be admitted free but was not. He made his way to the stable, clambered over a partition with a candle lantern and peered in to watch. The candle set fire to the hay within. It was reported that with no way to escape, 80 of the 140 people inside perished in the ensuing blaze. Whittaker was tried at Cambridge Assizes in 1728, but acquitted. 

The Newcastle Courant reported on the fire

The victims were buried in the churchyard of St Mary's, at the opposite end of the High Street, beneath a stone engraved with a blazing heart and angels' wings. An inscription on the reverse, added in 1910 when the stone was restored, states: "To the memory of the 78 people who were burnt to death in a barn at Burwell on Sept 8th 1727." Inside the church is a separate memorial to two other victims, John and Ann Palmer.  On 8 September 2005, a memorial plaque was unveiled at the site of the fire.

The Ipswich Journal of 26 February 1774 reported how "an old man who died recently near Newmarket who just before his death confessed that he set fire to a barn at Burwell, Cambridgeshire on the 8th of September 1727 when no less than 80 persons lost their lives and that having an antipathy to the puppet showman was the cause of him committing the action." That man was Richard Whittaker!

Governance
Burwell is a parish and thus has a parish council to deal with matters within the village. These include the maintenance and provision of both village halls, the recreation ground, playgrounds, and allotments. The Parish Council convenes at the Jubilee Reading Room on The Causeway.

Burwell parish lies within Burwell ward and provides three councillors to East Cambridgeshire District Council, which convenes at The Grange, Ely. A larger Burwell electoral division provides one councillor to Cambridgeshire County Council, convening at Shire Hall in Cambridge.

The local government boundary has varied over the years. At parish level, the boundary followed Devil's Dyke through the neighbouring village of Reach, bisecting it until it was turned into a new parish in 1961. The other boundaries of Burwell parish have also changed slightly over the years, most clearly on the south-eastern edge, where part of it including some of Newmarket Racecourse passed to Newmarket when the boundary was adjusted to follow the A14 bypass in 1993. The boundaries with Newmarket and Exning parishes follow the boundary between the counties of Cambridgeshire and Suffolk.

As elsewhere in England, a system of Hundreds covered Cambridgeshire until the 19th century. Burwell included the south-west edge of Staploe Hundred, along with the nearby parishes of Chippenham, Fordham, Isleham, Kennett, Landwade, Snailwell, Soham and Wicken.

East Cambridgeshire District Council came into being in 1974 under the Local Government Act 1972. Before the reorganisation, Burwell had lain inside Newmarket Rural District since 1894. Between 1875 and 1894, this was part of a larger Newmarket Rural Sanitary District which also encompassed Moulton Rural District in neighbouring West Suffolk.

The boundaries of Cambridgeshire itself also changed over the years up to 1974. Before Huntingdon and Peterborough joined the county in 1974, Burwell fell within Cambridgeshire and Isle of Ely, covering the southern and eastern parts of today's county. Between 1888 and 1965, the village fell within a smaller administrative county of Cambridgeshire, covering only the southern part of the present one.

Geography

Climate

Clunch quarry
Until the mid-20th century, a building material known as clunch – a soft rock which is one type of chalk limestone – was dug in Burwell. Remains of the open quarry can be seen either side of Bloomsfield. This was worked from 1252 to 1952 and used on many of the houses in Burwell. It remains the name of a local community magazine.

Priory Wood
Burwell has a small area of woodland planted in 1998 as a community project to mark the coming millennium. It is owned and maintained by the Woodland Trust. The official name comes from an ancient priory, which also gave its name to local roads such as Priory Close and Abbey Close.

Population

Notable people
In birth order:
Geoffrey de Mandeville, 1st Earl of Essex (died 1144) was mortally wounded at Burwell in the rebellion against Stephen, King of England.
Edward Fitzball (born Ball, 1792–1873), a London playwright specializing in melodrama, was born in Burwell.
William Wickins (1862–1933), Anglican Archbishop of Calcutta and Honorary Chaplain to the King, was a curate in Burwell.
Marjory Stephenson (1885–1948), a biochemist specializing in microbial metabolism, grew up in Burwell. She became one of the first two female members of the Royal Society in 1945.
Eric Ennion (1900–1981), natural historian and broadcaster, was a GP in Burwell for 20 years.
Thomas Malcolm Charlton (1923–1997), civil engineer and science historian, retired to Burwell in 1979.
John Louis Mansi (1926–2010), actor, lived in Burwell in the 1980s.
Lawrence Harvey (born 1972), formerly of the Turks and Caicos Islands national football team, has worked in Burwell as a quantity surveyor.

Culture and community

Carnival
The village hosts an annual carnival in June, which raises money for charity. A parade travels from Margaret Field in the south of the village to the Recreational Ground, where stalls and fairground rides are present.

Twinning
The village is twinned with Lizy-sur-Ourcq and Mary-sur-Marne and with a small town, Ocquerre. All three are situated in France; Lizy is mentioned on signs as you enter the village. Visits from Burwell to the twins are organised by the Burwell Village Twinning Association.

A plate marking the twinning is located on a wall outside the Year 3 classroom at the village primary school, Burwell Village College (Primary).

Philanthropy

The villages holds an annual Christmas Eve fund raising event which is run by business executive James Pryor. The annual event raises money for local causes.

Transport

Road access to Burwell is mainly along the B1102 Cambridge to Mildenhall road, which runs the length of the village, and the B1103, which links the village with Newmarket. The A14 passes along the southernmost edge of Burwell parish on the Cambridgeshire–Suffolk border, but cannot be joined without leaving the parish.

Bus transport is provided by Stagecoach in Cambridge route 10 running through the village between Cambridge and Newmarket. Stagecoach took over what used to be Cambus in the mid-1990s, Cambus itself having split from the Eastern Counties Omnibus Company in 1984. Eastern Counties absorbed Burwell and District in 1979, the local bus company having provided transport to nearby Cambridge, Newmarket and Bury St Edmunds, and to destinations further afield, such as Great Yarmouth and Felixstowe.

Between 1884 and 1965, railway station, in the south of the village, was served by the Cambridge to Mildenhall railway. The station closed to passengers in 1962. Although nothing of it remains, its earlier presence is acknowledged in the names of the streets Railway Close and Station Gate. There was also a halt on Newmarket Road to the south-east of the village, where the B1103 still goes over a former railway bridge.

To the north of the village, temporary tramways provided access from the nearby Ipswich to Ely Line to the local brickworks, situated near the Lode.

Burwell Lode is navigable up to the edge of the village at Anchor Lane. The Lode joins Reach Lode in the north-west corner of the parish before they flow into the River Cam at Upware, 5 miles from Burwell.

Education
Burwell contains a nursery, a Montessori and a playgroup for pre-school children. The old school house on the High Street, a listed building dating from 1864, is now a private residence.

Children attend Burwell Village College (Primary) up to the age of 11 and then go to secondary schools at either Soham or Bottisham.

Burwell Museum
The museum shows life through the centuries on the edge of the Cambridgeshire fens. Opened in 1992, it occupies a collection of buildings, some reconstructed from other sites, such as an 18th-century timber-framed barn, and others built in local style mainly with reclaimed materials, such as the wagon sheds/granary display area.

The displays are set out as "scenes" (resembling stage sets) with groups of artefacts making up each, to give an idea of how, where and when items were used. Themes and exhibits cover agriculture, period rooms and household items, military life, a blacksmith's shop, a reconstruction of a Roman potter's workshop, a Victorian school room, and vintage vehicles, carts and farm equipment.

The museum is a regular venue for school trips. Eight local schoolchildren appeared in 2012 in a TV programme about the Cambridgeshire fens that was filmed here.

The neighbouring Grade II*-listed windmill, Stevens' Mill, forms part of the museum and opens with it. It was probably built about 1820. It stayed in the Carter family until 1884, when it was sold to George Mason, who had been the tenant miller. By the 1920s, the mill, at one time powered also by steam, was owned by the Stevens family. When Warren Stevens retired in 1955, the mill became redundant and fell into disrepair. The Burwell Museum obtained funding of £400,000 from Heritage Lottery Fund to restore it.

Religion

Church of England
Burwell has a large, Grade I-listed parish church in the High Street in the south of the village. Dedicated to St Mary the Virgin, the church is in Perpendicular Gothic style and dates back to the 15th century, although some parts are older. It has an active churchgoing membership of 50–70. The vicar since April 2011 is Rev. Dr Eleanor Williams.

Baptist Church
At the northern end of the village, Burwell has a Baptist church with a membership of about 50. Since May 2015, the minister has been Rev. Chris Johnson.

Trinity Church
Located near St Mary's, Trinity is a small church founded by a merger of the Methodist and United Reformed communities in 1988. It has a regular congregation of about 20.

Others
The nearest Roman Catholic church is Our Lady and St Etheldreda in Newmarket. The village has a number of former churches converted to other uses. The large cemetery in Ness Road has a small non-denominational chapel.

Sport
Burwell Swifts F.C. play football in Division 1A of the NMC Cambridgeshire Football League, with a reserve team in Division 3B.

Burwell Tigers F.C. play association football in Division 5A of the NMC Cambridgeshire Football League.

There are two youth football clubs: the Burwell Swallows and Burwell Tigers.

Burwell Cricket Club is based on Tan House Lane, with a 1st XI in the East Anglian Premier League.

Media
The village has a community magazine, Clunch, dealing with news on a village level. The village is in the catchment areas of the Cambridge News and Newmarket Journal newspapers, and the radio stations BBC Radio Cambridgeshire and Heart East. For television Burwell is in the BBC East and ITV Anglia regions. Among several books on the village is an illustrated Memories of Burwell by Frank Czucha published in April 2017, available locally.Burwell Community Radio started broadcasting in 2020 and serves the village with a number of specialist music, documentary, interviews and community features.

See also
HMS Burwell (H94)

References

Notes

Sources

External links

burwell.co.uk
burwellvillage.net
Burwell Village College (Primary)
Burwell Museum
Burwell Village Twinning Association
St Mary's Church website
Cambridgeshire Churches: St Mary's, Burwell
Baptist Church website

 
Villages in Cambridgeshire
Civil parishes in Cambridgeshire
East Cambridgeshire District